A shot timer is a shot activated timer used in shooting sports, which starts the competitor by an audible signal and also records the competitor's time electronically by detecting the sound of each shot, together with the time from the start signal. When the competitor is finished, the timer will show the time from the start signal until the last shot. The time is usually recorded to hundredths of a second (centisecond), which is required by competitions in the International Practical Shooting Confederation.

History 
In 1924 Ed McGivern set a world record by firing six shots from a double-action revolver in four-fifths of a second. This time was measured with a complicated timing contraption attached to the revolver. This timing system was too complicated to be adapted in everyday shooting or shooting sports. 

Shooters began using stopwatches to time shooting, often paired with a "stop plate" (a steel target engaged at the end of a shooting stage) to try to measure the total shooting timer. 

In 1981, popular shooter and holster maker Bill Rodgers invented a new timing device that provided a start signal and an adjustable preset "par" end time. The goal being making all the required shots between the start and end signals of the timer. 

Soon after Ron Bailey of Competition Electronics built a timer with an included microphone that was able to mark the time of each shot fired.

In 1982, Ronin Colman created the PACT Championship Timer. Throughout the next two decades, shooters would transition from the stopwatches to shot timers and a new market was created.

Outside of competitive shooting, the adaptation and use of a shot timer are still relatively low. A study conducted in 2019 showed 82% of shooters surveyed do not use a shot timer at all, and 14.5% did not know what a shot timer was.

Types of sensors

Microphone 
Since the introduction of shot timers with microphones in the 1980s, this has been the most common method of detecting shots until today. The timer then usually has one or more microphones and is usually carried by a referee or official, or attached to the shooter's belt. Many timers have the option to adjust their audio pickup sensitivity. Loud firearms like large caliber rifles usually trigger the timer anyway, while less powerful firearms such as small caliber 5.6×15mmR (.22 LR) rifles often require the microphone to be adjusted to a more sensitive setting. If the pickup is set too sensitive there is a risk of detecting shots from other than the shooter intended to being measured or even speech.

Accelerometer 
There are also shot timers that attach to the firearm and detect shots using accelerometers and gyroscopes instead of using a separate hand-held device with microphones. These can also be used for data analysis of general movement of the firearm. Mantis was one of the first major manufacturers of such systems when they launched the MantisX system in 2015. Before that, Double Alpha Academy had launched the shot-timer watch ShotMaxx in 2013 after two years of development, which took advantage of data fusion using a built-in microphone and accelerometer to detect shots. These types of shot timers can be particularly be suitable for indoor ranges where there are a lot of gun sound reflections, or on quieter firearms such as small caliber rifles.

Common features and functions 

Some timers come with additional functions:
 Par times: The timer first gives a start, then a stop signal after a pre-programmed time.
 Instant or delayed start signal: The start signal can either come instantly by the push of the start button, or by a delay of a programmed number of seconds or within a range of seconds.
 Big board display: The possibility for direct connection to a big board display for instant audience feedback.
 Integration with an application on a mobile device such as RangeTech or Practiscore via Bluetooth.
 The possibility for scoring points on target in addition to the time, with automatic hit factor calculation, making for a complete scoring solution. The results can be loaded to a computer, i.e. by Bluetooth or RF.
 Splits between shots fired
 Memory storage of previous runs
 Auxiliary jack for external loud horn, visual starts or target turning
 Adjustable shot detector sensitivity
 Audible preparatory commands: An audible command to prep the shooter for the start signal. Often the words "Shooter Ready, Standby."

Mobile app shot timers 
A number of shot timer apps can also be downloaded for smartphones, although they are generally less reliable than dedicated standalone units. Traditional mobile phones and tablets lack the necessary style and quality of microphone to pick up gunshots; especially in a gun range where there are multiple shooters or at an indoor gun range where the sound is greater and the echo can also create a false positive on the timer.

However, many shooters use a mobile app-based shot timer only for its par function when conducting dry fire practice in which there is no need to pick up the sound of gunfire.

See also 
 Gun chronograph

References 

Shooting sports
Firearm terminology
Time measurement systems